Mulanje, formerly called Mlanje, is a town in the Southern Region of Malawi, close to the border with Mozambique, to the east. It is near the Mulanje Massif.

Location
The town of Mulanje lies along the M-2 highway from Thyolo to the west to the Mozambican border to the east. The geographical coordinates of the town of Mulanje are: 16°01'33.0"S, 35°30'29.0"E (Latitude:-16.025833; Longitude:35.508056).

Overview
Mulanje is a tourist attraction and serves as a staging base for climbers who want to scale Mount Mulanje or those who want to explore the countryside at its base. Residential and camping accommodation is available.

Mulanje is also the headquarters of the conservation group, the Mulanje Mountain Conservation Trust. The small town of Mulanje is the center of Malawi's tea growing industry. The Lujeri Tea Estate, adjacent to the border with Mozambique, is the location of the  Ruo–Ndiza Hydroelectric Power Station, that is owned and operated by Mulanje Renewable Energy Plc, a private enterprise.

Demographics

Points of interest
The following points of interest in or near the town of Mulanje include the following: (a) the offices of Mulanje Town Council (b) the offices of Mulanje District Administration (c) Mulanje District Hospital (d) a branch of National Bank of Malawi (e) a branch of NBS Bank and (f) the headquarters of Malawi-Mulanje Mountain Biodiversity Conservation Project.

See also
 Encephalartos gratus
 Widdringtonia whytei

References

Malawi–Mozambique border crossings
Populated places in Southern Region, Malawi
Mulanje District